Bumper Crop is a collection of short stories by Joe R. Lansdale published in 2004 by Golden Gryphon Press. In his introduction, he cites it as the companion piece to High Cotton, because he had so many stories which didn't quite fit in with the "Best of" but were more like "personal favorites." Initially issued as a hardcover, it has been reissued as a trade paperback.

In his introduction, Lansdale explains that the term bumper crop refers to a harvest which is so plentiful that it exceeds all expectations; the excess harvest is the "bumper crop."

Stories collected

References

External links
Author's Official Website

Short story collections by Joe R. Lansdale
2004 short story collections
Horror short story collections
Works by Joe R. Lansdale